James Larue Mohler is a Professor in the Department of Computer Graphics Technology at Purdue University, where he received his B.S. in Technical Graphics, M.S. in Industrial Technology and Ph.D. in Education. Dr. Mohler has been an Associate Professor since 1996, and since 2002 he has also served as Senior Research Scientist and Acting Director of Informatics.  In these capacities, he has received several major grants.

Dr. Mohler is a Purdue University Faculty Scholar, a faculty fellow for the Discovery Learning Center, and a member of the Purdue University Teaching Academy. He has been the recipient of several teaching awards beginning in 2000. From 1994 to 2000, he was  founder and producer of Sunrise Productions; Frankfort, Indiana, a print and hypermedia design company that he founded as an undergraduate.

He has served on the review board of the WebNet Journal and as the Executive Editor for the Journal of Interactive Instruction Development. He is a member of the professional association in his field,  ACM, ACM SIGGRAPH, IEEE, and ASEE, and has been active in various committees in SIGGRAPH.

Dr. Mohler has authored, co-authored, or contributed to over 21 texts related to computer graphics, multimedia, and hypermedia development.

References

External links
Official Website

Year of birth missing (living people)
Living people
Purdue University faculty
Purdue University alumni
People from Lafayette, Indiana